Campanula versicolor, the various-colored bellflower is a species of plant in the family Campanulaceae. It occurs from southeastern Italy to the Balkans.

References

versicolor
Taxa named by Henry Cranke Andrews